Fumaria schleicheri is a species of annual herb in the family Papaveraceae. They have a self-supporting growth form and have simple, broad leaves. Individuals can grow to 19 cm.

Sources

References 

schleicheri
Flora of Malta